Edgar Everett Pick (May 7, 1899 – May 13, 1967) was a third baseman in Major League Baseball. He played for the Cincinnati Reds and Chicago Cubs.

External links

1899 births
1967 deaths
Major League Baseball third basemen
Cincinnati Reds players
Chicago Cubs players
Hutchinson Wheat Shockers players
Kansas City Blues (baseball) players
Baseball players from Massachusetts